This is a list of numbered municipal roads in Quinte West, Belleville and Hastings County, Ontario.

The City of Quinte West and the City of Belleville are single-tier municipalities not under the jurisdiction of an upper-tier municipality such as Hastings County and thus, are outside of the geographic limits of Hastings County for municipal purposes. For geographic purposes however, Quinte West and Belleville are within the geographic limits of Hastings County. The cities form part of the county's census division.

List

References

Hastings
Transport in Hastings County